Qiji may refer to:

 Prince Qiji, later King Ping of Chu
Qiji (monk) (863-937), Chinese poet and Buddhist monk
Making Miracles, a 2007 Singaporean TV series
Miracles (1989 film), a Hong Kong film

Towns in China
 Qiji, Anhui, in Huainan, Anhui
 Qiji, Xingtai, Hebei
 Qiji, Wuji County, Hebei
 Qiji, Qingdao, Shandong
 Qiji, Yanggu County, Shandong
 Qiji, Shanxi, in Linyi County, Shanxi